Khesetoane Modjadji III (18691959) became the third Rain Queen from the South African Balobedu tribe of the South African Limpopo Province.  Khesetoane reigned from 1895 to 1959. She was preceded by Rain Queen Masalanabo Modjadji and succeeded by Rain Queen Makoma Modjadji.

Life
In 1894 her predecessor, Masalanabo Modjadji, committed ritual suicide. Khesetoane was the daughter of Masalanabo's "sister", Princess Leakhali, and became the heir because Masalanabo's council had already designated it before Masalanabo's death. The Royal Family names rotates between Masalababo, Mokope,  Makoma, Makobo.

The late Queen Makobo Modjadji and Princess Tebogo Modjadji (Now Modjadji-Kekana) were very close family members and confidantes who gave birth to their children Masalababo and Mohau (Khesetoane) days apart.

Both Royal members chose education first before Royal duties.

Princess Tebogo Modjadji (Modjadji-Kekana) progressed to being a Dr. of Philosophy, and founded the Rain Queen Modjadji Foundation and Awards and the Royal Princesses Association in South Africa to pursue her dreams of instilling the Balobedu Culture after completing her 1st PhD degree.

She married Amandebele a Moletlane Prince Makera Kekana, appointed as the Bakoena Royal Council.

References

1869 births
1959 deaths
Rain Queens
19th-century women rulers
20th-century women rulers